Johanna Maria Heldin (born 29 August 1994) is a Swedish curler.

Career

Juniors
Heldin played for Sweden at the 2012 Youth Olympics, throwing lead rocks for the team, which was skipped by Rasmus Wranå. The team finished fourth. She was paired with New Zealand's Luke Steele in the mixed doubles event and were eliminated in the round of 16.

Heldin played second for team Sweden at the 2015 World Junior Curling Championships, on a team skipped by Isabella Wranå. The team would end up finishing fourth. She was invited to be Sweden's fifth player at the 2016 World Junior Curling Championships on a team skipped by Therese Westman. Heldin played in eight games and team finished in sixth place.

Mixed
Heldin played for Sweden at two World Mixed Curling Championships, winning the silver medal at both the 2015 and 2016 World Mixed Curling Championship. The teams were skipped by Rasmus Wranå and Kristian Lindström respectively.

Personal life
Born in Uppsala, Heldin is employed as a "junior doctor". Prior to this, she was a medical student at Uppsala University. She is in a relationship with Kristian Lindström.

Teams

References

External links
 

Living people
1994 births
Swedish female curlers
Curlers at the 2012 Winter Youth Olympics
Sportspeople from Uppsala
Uppsala University alumni
Curlers at the 2022 Winter Olympics
Olympic curlers of Sweden
Olympic bronze medalists for Sweden
Olympic medalists in curling
Medalists at the 2022 Winter Olympics
20th-century Swedish women
21st-century Swedish women